Christophe Paul F. Lepoint (born 24 October 1984) is a Belgian professional footballer who plays as a central midfielder for Belgian First Division A club Seraing.

Club career
On 31 January 2011, he was seriously injured in a car accident.  He fell asleep in the passenger seat of a car being driven by his teammate Sébastien Bruzzese who, it is alleged, had been drinking. Afterwards, he struggled to get back into the first team and was loaned out to Waasland-Beveren in the summer of 2012. After a series of good performances for Waasland-Beveren and with Gent struggling in the league, Gent offered to loan out Stijn De Smet and Jordan Remacle to allow Lepoint to return to Gent early.

On 29 January 2015, Lepoint signed for Charlton Athletic on a -year deal.

On 17 June 2015, Lepoint signed for Zulte Waregem for an undisclosed fee.

On 17 January 2021, he returned to Mouscron and signed a contract until July 2022.

On 3 June 2022, Lepoint signed a two-year contract with Seraing.

International career
On 19 May 2010, he made his debut in the Belgium national team in a friendly match against Bulgaria in Brussels and scored the equaliser in a 2–1 win.

Career statistics

Club

International goals

Honours
Gent
Belgian Pro League: 2009–10 runners-up
Belgian Cup: 2009–10

Zulte Waregem
 Belgian Cup: 2016-17

References

External links
 
 
 

1984 births
Living people
Footballers from Brussels
Association football midfielders
Belgian footballers
Eredivisie players
Belgium international footballers
Belgium under-21 international footballers
Belgium youth international footballers
Belgian expatriate footballers
Belgian expatriate sportspeople in the Netherlands
Belgian expatriate sportspeople in Germany
Belgian expatriate sportspeople in Turkey
Belgian expatriate sportspeople in England
Expatriate footballers in the Netherlands
Expatriate footballers in Germany
Expatriate footballers in Turkey
Expatriate footballers in England
R.S.C. Anderlecht players
TSV 1860 Munich players
TSV 1860 Munich II players
Willem II (football club) players
Gençlerbirliği S.K. footballers
A.F.C. Tubize players
Royal Excel Mouscron players
K.A.A. Gent players
S.K. Beveren players
Charlton Athletic F.C. players
S.V. Zulte Waregem players
K.V. Kortrijk players
R.F.C. Seraing (1922) players
Bundesliga players
2. Bundesliga players
Süper Lig players
Belgian Pro League players
English Football League players